The St. George Plantation House, in or near Schriever, Louisiana was added to the National Register of Historic Places in 1982.

It is a raised, one-story, frame and weatherboard plantation house reflecting late Greek Revival style.  It has "handsomely landscaped grounds" in its semi-rural location in the center of Schriever, in Terrebonne Parish, Louisiana.  Its "most prominent architectural feature is its front facade.  This composition is dominated by a heroically scaled colonnade of six sixteen-inch square columns rising 13-1/2 feet to support a massive entablature. The fenestration beyond this colonnade is composed of a center pair of large glazed doors with a transom, side lights and a heavy overdoor. The doors are balanced on each side by a pair of double hung windows which open to the floor level giving access from the gallery to the front rooms."

References

Houses on the National Register of Historic Places in Louisiana
Houses in Terrebonne Parish, Louisiana
National Register of Historic Places in Terrebonne Parish, Louisiana
Greek Revival architecture in Louisiana